Hasarius mahensis is a species of jumping spider. The species is endemic to Mahé Island of Seychelles.

References

Salticidae
Fauna of Seychelles
Spiders of Africa
Spiders described in 1984